The Lidu Bridge  is a cable-stayed bridge which crosses the Yangtze River in the Fuling District of Chongqing, China.

See also
Yangtze River bridges and tunnels

References

Bridges in Chongqing
Bridges over the Yangtze River
Cable-stayed bridges in China
Bridges completed in 2007